Puerto Rico Senatorial District IV, also known as the Senatorial District of Mayagüez-Aguadilla, is one of the eight senatorial districts of Puerto Rico. It is currently represented by Evelyn Vázquez and Luis Daniel Muñiz (both from the New Progressive Party).

District profile

The Senatorial District IV has an approximate population of 478,194. It covers the following municipalities:
 Aguada
 Aguadilla
 Añasco
 Cabo Rojo
 Hormigueros
 Isabela
 Las Marías
 Mayagüez
 Moca
 Rincón
 San Germán
 San Sebastián

In previous distributions, the territory covered by the Senatorial District IV has changed. In 1972 and 1983, the District included the municipalities of Lajas and Maricao. In the 1991 redistribution, both were assigned to the District of Ponce, while Isabela was reassigned to the district.

The district hasn't suffered changes in the recent redistributions of 2002 and 2011.

Election results

2012

|-
! style="background-color:#FF0000" |
| style="width: 130px" | Popular Democratic Party (PPD)
|               | María Teresa González
| 125,353
| 26.55
| 
|-
! style="background-color:#FF0000" |
| style="width: 130px" | Popular Democratic Party (PPD)
|               | Gilberto Rodríguez
| 121,396
| 25.71
| 
|-
! style="background-color:#0080FF" |
| style="width: 130px" | New Progressive Party (PNP)
|               | Luis Daniel Muñíz
| 105,666
| 22.38
| -3.31
|-
! style="background-color:#0080FF" |
| style="width: 130px" | New Progressive Party (PNP)
|               | Evelyn Vázquez
| 103,042
| 21.82
| -3.59
|-
! style="background-color:#01DF3A" |
| style="width: 130px" | Puerto Rican Independence Party (PIP)
|               | Orlando Ruíz Pesante
| 5,594
| 1.18
| 
|-
! style="background-color:#01DF3A" |
| style="width: 130px" | Puerto Rican Independence Party (PIP)
|               | Samuel Soto Bosques
| 5,483
| 1.16
| -0.57
|-
! style="background-color:#008080" |
| style="width: 130px" | Movimiento Unión Soberanista (MUS)
|               | Alberto O. Lozada Colón
| 1,461
| 0.33
| 
|-
! style="background-color:#800080" |
| style="width: 130px" | Worker's People Party of Puerto Rico (PPT)
|               | Edwin Morales Pérez
| 1,112
| 0.24
|

2008

|-
! style="background-color:#0080FF" |
| style="width: 130px" | New Progressive Party (PNP)
|               | Luis Daniel Muñiz
| 125,731
| 25.69%
| +1.17
|-
! style="background-color:#0080FF" |
| style="width: 130px" | New Progressive Party (PNP)
|               | Evelyn Vázquez
| 124,329
| 25.41
| 
|-
! style="background-color:#FF0000" |
| style="width: 130px" | Popular Democratic Party (PPD)
|               | Sergio Ortíz Quiñones
| 107,399
| 21.95
| 
|-
! style="background-color:#FF0000" |
| style="width: 130px" | Popular Democratic Party (PPD)
|               | Enid Toro de Báez
| 107,091
| 21.88
| 
|-
! style="background-color:#FFBF00" |
| style="width: 130px" | Puerto Ricans for Puerto Rico Party (PPR)
|               | Yesenia García Vélez
| 5,699
| 1.16
| 
|-
! style="background-color:#01DF3A" |
| style="width: 130px" | Puerto Rican Independence Party (PIP)
|               | Reynaldo Acevedo Vélez
| 5,543
| 1.13
| 
|-
! style="background-color:#01DF3A" |
| style="width: 130px" | Puerto Rican Independence Party (PIP)
|               | Ubaldo M. Soto Miranda
| 5,230
| 1.07
| 
|-
! style="background-color:#FFBF00" |
| style="width: 130px" | Puerto Ricans for Puerto Rico Party (PPR)
|               | Aníbal Nieves
| 5,158
| 1.05
|

2004

|-
! style="background-color:#0080FF" |
| style="width: 130px" | New Progressive Party (PNP)
|               | Luis Daniel Muñiz
| 124,922
| 24.52%
| 
|-
! style="background-color:#0080FF" |
| style="width: 130px" | New Progressive Party (PNP)
|               | Carlos Pagán
| 121,911
| 23.93
| +1.53
|-
! style="background-color:#FF0000" |
| style="width: 130px" | Popular Democratic Party (PPD)
|               | Jorge Ramos Vélez
| 121,044
| 23.76
| 
|-
! style="background-color:#FF0000" |
| style="width: 130px" | Popular Democratic Party (PPD)
|               | Rafael Irizarry
| 120,783
| 23.71
| -0.39
|-
! style="background-color:#01DF3A" |
| style="width: 130px" | Puerto Rican Independence Party (PIP)
|               | Jorge Schmidt Nieto
| 9,355
| 1.84
| 
|-
! style="background-color:#01DF3A" |
| style="width: 130px" | Puerto Rican Independence Party (PIP)
|               | Samuel Soto Bosques
| 8,817
| 1.73
|

References

External links
Distribución de Distritos Senatoriales de Puerto Rico

Puerto Rico Senatorial districts